Antoni Giełgud (1792-1831) was a Polish-Lithuanian military officer, a general during the November Uprising.

Early life 
Giełgud was born into the Giełgud (Gelgaudai) family in 1792.

Napoleonic Wars 
During the French invasion of Russia, he financed and commanded the creation of the 21st Infantry Regiment of Army of the Duchy of Warsaw, which he led since 29 August 1812. He took part in the defence of Modlin fortress.

November Uprising 
During the November Uprising he returned to active service and initially served as a commanding officer of the 1st Brigade, 1st Infantry Division under Jan Krukowiecki. A hero of the battles of Wawer and Białołęka, he was given command over the entire 2nd Infantry Division. He covered the retreat of Polish-Lithuanian forces after the battle of Ostrołęka, but got separated from the main force and decided to head for Lithuania instead.

He defeated the Russians in the Battle of Rajgród, but his assault of Vilnius failed and his corps composed of his own division and the forces of Dezydery Chłapowski lost over 2,000 men in the battle of Paneriai. Unable to return to Polish-Lithuanian main forces at that time converging on Warsaw, he decided to head to Klaipėda (Memel), where he was expecting foreign reinforcements. En route, however, all three Giełgud's columns were intercepted by the Russians and forced to cross the Prussian border. Giełgud himself soon after crossing the border was shot dead by one of his staff officers, enraged by his poor command. He died 31 August 1831 in the Šnaukštai (Schnaugsten) village, Lithuania and was buried in a nearby Kisiniai (Kisin) town,  from Klaipėda.

References

Bibliography 
 

1792 births
1831 deaths
Lithuanian generals
Polish generals
Recipients of the Virtuti Militari
Generals of the November Uprising